Adabaria may refer to:

Adabaria, Barguna, Bangladesh
Adabaria, Patuakhali, Bangladesh